Bairo is a comune (municipality) in the Metropolitan City of Turin in the Italian region of Piedmont, about  north of Turin.

Bairo borders the following municipalities: Castellamonte, Torre Canavese, Agliè, and Ozegna.

References

Cities and towns in Piedmont